Mehmet Erdem Uğurlu (born 9 July 1988) is a Turkish professional footballer who plays as a midfielder for Iğdır.

Professional career
On 19 June 2019, signed his first professional contract with Gaziantep as they were promoted into the Süper Lig. Uğurlu made his professional debut in a 4-1 Süper Lig loss to Trabzonspor on 19 October 2019.

References

External links

TFF Profile
Mackolik Profile

1988 births
Living people
People from Kırıkkale
Turkish footballers
Association football midfielders
Gaziantep F.K. footballers
Göztepe S.K. footballers
MKE Ankaragücü footballers
Ankaraspor footballers
Ankara Keçiörengücü S.K. footballers
Altay S.K. footballers
Bursaspor footballers
Süper Lig players
TFF First League players
TFF Second League players
TFF Third League players